Fake Reaction is a British television comedy panel game shown on ITV2 that ran for two series from 3 January 2013 to 6 March 2014 presented by Matt Edmondson with regular team captains Joe Swash and Ellie Taylor.

Production
A pilot edition was recorded in April 2012 for BBC Three, however the show was picked up by ITV2 for an eight-episode run from 3 January 2013. A second series of ten episodes began production in late 2013, and premiered on 2 January 2014.

On 3 September 2014, Edmondson revealed that the programme had been axed after two series.

Transmissions

References

External links

2010s British comedy television series
2010s British game shows
2013 British television series debuts
2014 British television series endings
British panel games
English-language television shows
ITV comedy
ITV panel games
Television series by STV Studios
Television shows shot at BBC Elstree Centre